"Memories" is a song by French disc jockey David Guetta featuring vocals from American rapper Kid Cudi. It was released in August 2009 as the fourth single from Guetta's fourth studio album, One Love. The song became a top five hit in Austria, Belgium, Czech Republic, Australia, the Netherlands, Finland, Poland, New Zealand, France and Ireland. It charted within the top ten in Germany, Hungary, Switzerland and Denmark. The music video was filmed in Miami and directed by Keith Schofield. The song also attained platinum status in the US by the Recording Industry Association of America (RIAA).

Critical reception
Robert Copsey of Digital Spy gave the song a positive review stating: "Here he drafts in Kid 'Day N' Nite' Cudi to lay down the vocals over his trademark piano-backed beats. All the makings of a Guetta classic are present and correct, and Cudi's nonchalant, mellow vocals are pleasant enough, but it all feels that bit too familiar. It's hard to avoid the conclusion that 'Memories' adds nothing new to a sound that seemingly took over the world in '09 – not that anyone's going to grumble when it comes on at Oceana this Friday night, of course".

Music video
The music video was filmed in Miami on 4 January 2010. It was directed by Keith Schofield. It shows Kid Cudi, wearing a Guns N' Roses T-shirt and a Cleveland Indians baseball hat, and David Guetta walking along Biscayne Boulevard, while the club scenes were filmed in Nocturnal. Fans were invited to be in the club scene. There is also a scene that takes place in a Franck Provost hair dressing salon, where a hairdresser is using a hair dryer on a hairless man, and another applies shaving foam in a circle on another client's head. It shows the camera crew to be nude models, who are seen reflecting in windows, metal objects and mirrors throughout the video with certain areas censored out. A super clean version of the video was released for use in public settings.

2021 remix 
In 2021, Guetta released a new remix of the track. The remix was premiered during his New Year's live set from the French Louvre museum. It was also released as a reaction to the TikTok hype around the original track, which became popular during the lockdown due to COVID-19.

Track listing
 UK CD single
"Memories" – 3:28
"Memories" (Fuck Me I'm Famous Remix) – 6:06

 French CD single
"Memories" – 3:28
"Memories" (Extended) – 5:20
"Memories" (Fuck Me I'm Famous Remix) – 6:06

Charts and certifications

Weekly charts

2021 remix

Year-end charts

2021 remix

Certifications

Radio and release history

Release history

Radio history

See also
 List of Polish Dance Chart number-one singles of 2010

References

External links
 

2009 songs
David Guetta songs
House music songs
Kid Cudi songs
Songs written by David Guetta
Songs written by Frédéric Riesterer
Songs written by Kid Cudi
Ultratop 50 Singles (Wallonia) number-one singles
Virgin Records singles
Song recordings produced by David Guetta